Close-Up Vol. 4, Songs of Family is the eleventh studio album by New York-based singer/songwriter and musician Suzanne Vega

. The album consists of re-recordings of songs from Vega's back catalogue with stripped-down arrangements that highlight her lyrics and melodies.  Two of the songs, "Brother Mine" and "The Silver Lady", are songs Vega wrote more than 30 years ago, but are only now seeing an official recording and release.  "Daddy is White" is a song she wrote back in 2007, previously only existing as a demo attached to an article in The New York Times titled "Which Side Are You On?" she wrote in 2008.

Track listing 
"Pilgrimage" was recorded in October 2011. , the album was "almost done".

Charts

References

2012 albums
Suzanne Vega albums